The Timid Toreador is a 1940 Warner Bros. Looney Tunes cartoon directed by Bob Clampett and Norman McCabe. The short was released on December 21, 1940, and stars Porky Pig.

Plot
The scene descends upon a small Mexican town, where a large woman intensely washes a union suit (and the suit returns the favor) in a public fountain, while a mariachi band performs outside the Brown Sombrero. Porky Pig is selling tamales that are so hot, a nearby bird that steals one promptly explodes and is roasted.

At the local stadium, the townspeople gather to watch a hotly anticipated bullfight pitting matador Ponchi Pancho against Slapsie Maxie Rosenbull, the Mexican Golden Gloves champion bull of 1940. Both humans and "contented cows" are excited to watch the fight. When the bell sounds, the matador flaps his cape and Slapsie charges into the matador. At first, Slapsie admires Ponchi's cape, but then takes it from him. Ponchi screams and runs away with Slapsie giving chase. Ponchi makes it over a bullseye fence and Slapsie hits it so hard that a mounted spectator in the ring laughs hysterically at him. An annoyed Slapsie chalks up his horn as though it were a pool cue ("Screwball in the side pocket") and charges into him, transforming the heckler and his horse into a centaur.

Porky arrives in the stadium and wanders into the ring, offering to sell Slapsie a tamale before realizing his customer and running away. After a brief chase, Slapsie blocks Porky's escape but is enticed by the smell of the tamales and offers to buy one, skeptical of its heat. As the tamale takes effect and burns Slapsie's innards, he panics and busts a hole through the stadium walls, stampeding away in pain.  The spectators declare Porky champion and hero, lavishing him with hats; when a small derby lands on his head, he imitates Oliver Hardy.

Home media
Laserdisc - Longitude and Looneytude: Globetrotting Looney Tunes Favorites
DVD - Porky Pig 101

References

External links 
 
 

1940 short films
1940 animated films
Bullfighting films
1940s animated short films
American black-and-white films
1940s English-language films
Films directed by Bob Clampett
Films directed by Norman McCabe
Looney Tunes shorts
Warner Bros. Cartoons animated short films
Porky Pig films
Films scored by Carl Stalling
Animated films about mammals
Films about pigs
Films set in Mexico
1940s Warner Bros. animated short films
American comedy short films
American animated short films
Films about cattle